J Venkatappa (15 May 1928 - 22 August 2010) was an Indian politician who served in the Member of Mysore legislative Assembly from 1957 to 1962  and was a Member of Rajya Sabha (the Upper house of the Parliament of India) from 1962 to 1968. He was born on 15 May 1928. J. Naranappa was his father. He was person who started Ethihanole project which is currently in progress where he got paramashivaiah to conduct a DPR and submit the report to the government. He donated 5 lakh rupees in 1960 to the government to start the project. Even today people in his constituency remember him for the work he is done.

Position held

References 

Indian politicians
1928 births
2010 deaths
Rajya Sabha members from Karnataka